The Green Forest (in Romanian Pădurea Verde, in Hungarian Vadászerdő, in German Jagdwald, the last two translated as "hunting forest") is an urban forest located in northeastern Timișoara, covering an area of 724 ha (or 737 ha according to other sources). It is seen as Timișoara's green lung and is also an important recreation and leisure area.

History 
The forest near the Timișoara Fortress had an area of about 500 ha and was declared since 1732 a hunting area reserved exclusively for the first governor of Banat, Count Claude Florimond de Mercy. After 1753, when the civil administration was introduced in Banat, the forest, permanently guarded by hussars, became accessible to other senior officers. At that time, its area was almost double that of today. Half of the forest was cut down at the beginning of the 20th century, the land being transformed into arable land for the Hungarian colony established in the current Dumbrăvița commune.

The Green Forest has an artificial character, being arranged for the first time in 1860 by the Hungarian Forest Service. Two other arrangements followed in 1894 and 1908. In the interwar period, the forest was a Royal Crown domain and was intended for pheasant, stag and deer hunting. The city's forest nursery was established in 1929. From the planting material produced in the forest nursery (oak, maple, elm, walnut, sycamore, linden, etc.) the National Revival Forest (present-day Green Forest) took shape in 1937–1938. In 1954, the state made 150 ha of the forest available to the city for the establishment of a nature reserve and a recreational area.

In 2020, the Romanian Government transferred 520 ha from Romsilva to the Timișoara City Hall for the arrangement of a forest park. Until 2020, the Timișoara City Hall managed 50 ha of the Green Forest.

Geography 
The Green Forest is located in the northeastern part of Timișoara and its surface, measuring about 737 ha, is divided into 78 plots more or less square-shaped. The forest is crossed on a length of 2.6 km by Behela (tributary of the Bega River), which feeds, before entering the forest, the Dumbrăvița artificial lake, a place of leisure for tourists and fishermen.

Flora 
The woody species that grow in the Green Forest are pedunculate oak (Quercus robur), common hornbeam (Carpinus betulus), common ash (Fraxinus excelsior), Tatar maple (Acer tataricum), field maple (Acer campestre), Turkey oak (Quercus cerris), linden (Tilia sp.) and black locust (Robinia pseudoacacia). The predominant species is Quercus sp. (69%), followed by Fraxinus excelsior (10%). 5% of the existing trees are aged between 101 and 120 years, 21% between 81 and 100 years, with 61- to 80-years-old trees predominating (41%). The shrub layer includes common hawthorn (Crataegus monogyna), blackthorn (Prunus spinosa), Cornelian cherry (Cornus mas) and common privet (Ligustrum vulgare), while the herbaceous layer is composed of mosses and lichens and herbaceous plants.

References 

Forests of Romania
Parks in Timișoara
Geography of Timiș County